Aladino was an Italian Eurodance act that formed in 1993 by producers Giacomo Maiolini, Diego Abaribi, Andrea Savini, DJ Silvio Perrone, Giordano Trivellato, Stefano Brignoli, Andrea Bruciato, Luigi "Mr. Cheng" Lacerenza,  Giuliano Sacchetto, Mauro Marcolin, & Valerio Gaffurini. The Project featured the vocalists of Emanuela Gubinelli, Sandy Chambers & Sagi Rei.

Singles

References

Italian Eurodance groups